Chemmalai Maha Vidyalayam also spelt Cemmalai is a   provincial school in Chemmalai, Alampil, Mullaitivu District, Sri Lanka. School girls studying in this school were among those killed in the Chencholai bombing. [Citation overkill]

See also
 List of schools in Northern Province, Sri Lanka

References

Provincial schools in Sri Lanka
Schools in Mullaitivu District